Jhumka regional prison (Nepali:झुम्का कारागार, Jhumka Karagar) is the largest correction centre in Eastern Nepal. It is located near Jhumka town in Sunsari district. Initially, it had capacity of 500 inmates; it was upgraded in 2014 to accommodate 1500 inmates. The prison has a facility of education and training for the prisoners.

Jailbreaks
12 inmates escaped the jail by digging a tunnel in 2012.

See also
List of prisons in Nepal

References

Prisons in Nepal